Donna Ritchie (born 28 December 1963 in Manly, New South Wales is a wheelchair basketball player from Australia.  She was part of the silver medal-winning Australia women's national wheelchair basketball team at the 2000 Summer Paralympics.

Personal
Richie was born on 28 December 1963 in Manly, New South Wales. Her parents were Ray and Georgina with siblings Sharon and Raymond. Her father Ray played first grade rugby league for Manly Sea Eagles and was first grade coach from 1981 to 1982. At the age of 23, Ritchie broke the T5 and T6 vertebrae in her spine after falling backwards from a stone wall at Manly Beach.

During the 1996 Atlanta Paralympics, she met Dutch wheelchair basketballer Koen Jansens. They married in 1999 and have a son and a daughter.

In the lead up to the 2000 Sydney Paralympics, Ritchie was the Sydney Paralympic Organising Committee's Community Relations Manager. Since December 1995, she has been a New South Wales Institute of Sport board member.
In 2015, she is the general manager, Investment, Telstra Business. and a New South Wales Institute of Sport board member.

Basketball career

Ritchie whilst recovering from her accident in hospital saw wheelchair basketballers training and this led to her taking up the sport. Her wheelchair basketball classification is 1.5 points. She attended three Paralympics Games – 1992 Barcelona, 1996 Atlanta and 2000 Sydney. The Gliders, national women's basketball team, came fourth in 1992 and 1996 and won the silver medal in 2000. She was vice-captain at the 1992 Games and captain at the 1996 and 2000 Games.

Ritchie was a member of the Gliders at three World Championships – 1990, 1994 and 1998. The Gliders won the bronze medal in 1994 and 1998.

Recognition
 Manly Pathway of Olympians
 Australian Sports Medal
 Northern Beaches Sporting Hall of Fame – inducted in 2003

External links
Paralympian wheelchair basketballer Donna Ritchie – Conversations with Richard Fidler

References

Paralympic wheelchair basketball players of Australia
Paralympic silver medalists for Australia
Wheelchair category Paralympic competitors
Wheelchair basketball players at the 1992 Summer Paralympics
Wheelchair basketball players at the 1996 Summer Paralympics
Wheelchair basketball players at the 2000 Summer Paralympics
Living people
Medalists at the 2000 Summer Paralympics
Sportswomen from New South Wales
Recipients of the Australian Sports Medal
1963 births
Basketball players from Sydney
People from Manly, New South Wales
People with paraplegia
Paralympic medalists in wheelchair basketball